Piers Andrew Charles Wauchope (born 1956) is a British barrister and politician who served as interim leader of the UK Independence Party (UKIP) between June and August 2019, following the resignation of Gerard Batten.

Previously a member of the Conservative Party, Wauchope was a councillor representing Adelaide and later Belsize wards in the London Borough of Camden from 1998 to 2006, having unsuccessfully stood in the wards of Holborn (in 1986) and Bloomsbury (in 1994). He served as leader of the Conservative Group, and of the opposition, on Camden Council from 2000 to 2006, replacing Pamela Chesters. After leaving the Conservative Party, he joined UKIP and was elected to the NEC in 2015.

Wauchope trained as a criminal barrister, being called to the bar in 1985, and specialises in children's law, injunctions and domestic violence. In 2010, he made the news after separating two brawling men during a court session at Snaresbrook Crown Court. Wauchope was unhurt in the scuffle, having only his glasses knocked off. In 2015, he represented former UKIP parliamentary candidate Matthew Smith in an electoral fraud case.

He was educated at Worth School and the University of Manchester. In addition to authoring legal guides and contributing to journals, Wauchope has written a political history of the London Borough of Camden called Camden: A Political History 1964-2006, which the Camden New Journal described as "An intriguing, witty read......his retelling of power struggles and forgotten gossip sparkles".

Electoral history
In the 2012 United Kingdom local elections, Wauchope ran as a UKIP candidate and won the Rusthall electoral ward seat on Tunbridge Wells Borough Council. He beat the incumbent Conservative councillor and council leader Bob Atwood by 46 votes. He left the position on 16 April 2015.

He stood to be the first police and crime commissioner for Kent in the 2012 elections, but was eliminated in the first round of voting. He also stood unsuccessfully as a UKIP candidate in the 2016 London Assembly election and the 2019 European Parliament election for the South East England seat.

References

Living people
1956 births
Leaders of the UK Independence Party
British barristers
Councillors in the London Borough of Camden
Conservative Party (UK) councillors